Otmane El Assas (born 30 January 1979) is a retired Moroccan footballer who played most of his career as a midfielder for Qatar Stars League outfit Al Gharrafa.

He was part of the Moroccan 2004 Olympic football team, who exited in the first round, finishing third in group D, behind group winners Iraq and runners-up Costa Rica. He also competed at the 2000 Summer Olympics in Sydney.

He is the longest serving foreign professional footballer in the Qatar Stars League as of 2014.

References

External links 

1979 births
Living people
Moroccan footballers
Moroccan expatriate footballers
Olympic footballers of Morocco
Footballers at the 2000 Summer Olympics
Footballers at the 2004 Summer Olympics
Sharjah FC players
Expatriate footballers in Saudi Arabia
Expatriate footballers in the United Arab Emirates
Expatriate footballers in Qatar
Moroccan expatriate sportspeople in Saudi Arabia
Moroccan expatriate sportspeople in the United Arab Emirates
Moroccan expatriate sportspeople in Qatar
Umm Salal SC players
Qatar Stars League players
2002 African Cup of Nations players
People from Khouribga
Morocco international footballers
Al-Gharafa SC players
Olympique Club de Khouribga players
Association football midfielders
UAE Pro League players